Bacsik  is a surname. Notable people with the surname include:

 Elek Bacsik (1926–1993), jazz violinist and guitarist
 Mike Bacsik (left-handed pitcher) (born 1977)
 Mike Bacsik (right-handed pitcher) (born 1952)

See also
 Bacs (disambiguation)

Hungarian-language surnames